1Up is a 2022 American comedy film directed by Kyle Newman and written by Julia Yorks. It stars Paris Berelc, Taylor Zakhar Perez, Hari Nef, and Ruby Rose. It was released on July 15, 2022, by Amazon Studios.

Plot
Vivian “V” Lee is a competitive gamer whose impressive skills have landed her a college scholarship and a place on the Betas, Barrett University’s male-dominated team. But when the Betas’ captain Dustin tells V she’ll never be a starting player, it’s game on. Joined by her best friend Sloane, and under the guidance of her coach Parker, V forms a fierce all-girl team to band together with one common goal: level up to the nationals…and take down the Betas!

Cast
 Paris Berelc as Vivian 
 Taylor Zakhar Perez as Dustin
 Hari Nef as Sloane
 Ruby Rose as Parker
 Nicholas Coombe as Owen
 D.J. Mausner as Diane
 Madison Baines as Lilly
 Lolita Milena as Jenna
 Kevin Farley as Dean Davis
 Robert Levey II as Ace 
 Rami Khan as Adi 
 Stephen Joffe as Riccardo
 Aviva Mongillo as Indigo
 Kataem O'Connor as Lance
 Daniel Williston as Lewis

Production
In October 2020, it was announced Elliot Page and Paris Berelc had joined the cast of the film, with Kyle Newman set to direct from a screenplay by Julia Yorks, with BuzzFeed Studios set to produce the film. In January 2021, Ruby Rose, Taylor Zakhar Perez, Hari Nef and Nicholas Coombe joined the cast of the film, with Rose replacing Page, with Lionsgate set to distribute.

Principal photography took place from November 27, 2020 to February 21, 2021, in Toronto.

Release
In May 2022, Amazon Studios acquired the distribution rights to the film. It was released on July 15, 2022, on Amazon Prime Video.

References

External links
 

2022 films
2020s American films
2020s English-language films
American comedy films
Films directed by Kyle Newman
Films shot in Toronto
Lionsgate films